RTÉ is Raidió Teilifís Éireann, the Irish public broadcaster.

RTE may also refer to:

Business
 Real-time enterprise, who fulfil orders immediately
 Réseau de Transport d'Électricité, France's electrical transmission operator

Politics
 Recep Tayyip Erdoğan (born 1954), president of Turkey
 Right to Education Act, a 2009 decree in India

Science and technology
 Radiative transfer equation, in physics
 Round-trip engineering, in programming tools
 Runtime environment, a subsystem a program runs in

Transport
 Route 128 (Amtrak station), in Massachusetts, United States (by station code)
 Campo de Marte Airport, São Paulo, Brazil (by IATA code)